Tyrpophloeus is a genus of bark beetles. About 12 species comprise the genus, ranging from North America to Europe and Asia.  The genus is little-known, but T. populi has recently become important as the causative agent of sudden aspen decline.

Other species' host are mainly poplars, willows and alders.

Partial species list 
 Trypophloeus alni
 Trypophloeus asperatus
 Trypophloeus bispinulus
 Trypophloeus discedens
 Trypophloeus klimeschi
 Trypophloeus populi Hopkins, 1915
 Trypophloeus striatulus
 Trypophloeus thatcheri

References 

Scolytinae
Curculionidae genera